Soberana may refer to:

Alcohol 
 Soberana, a beer from Panama

Medicine 
 FINLAY-FR-2, COVID-19 vaccine candidate, also known as SOBERANA-02, which followed the earlier SOBERANA-01, produced by the Finlay Institute, a Cuban epidemiological research institute.